Windsor Colliery Halt railway station served Windsor Colliery in the village of Abertridwr, in the historic county of Glamorgan, Wales, from 1943 to 1964 on the Senghenydd branch of the Rhymney Railway.

History
The station was opened on 6 September 1943 by the Great Western Railway, although the agreement for the station was made on 4 October of the same year. It closed on 15 June 1964.

References

Disused railway stations in Caerphilly County Borough
Former Great Western Railway stations
Beeching closures in Wales
Railway stations in Great Britain opened in 1943
Railway stations in Great Britain closed in 1964
1943 establishments in Wales
1964 disestablishments in Wales